Zarafa may refer to:

 Zarafa (film), an animated film
 Zarafa (giraffe), a present to Charles X of France from Muhammad Ali of Egypt
 Zarafa (software), a groupware software application